The A8 road is an A-Grade trunk road in Sri Lanka. It connects Panadura with Ratnapura, also passing through Bandaragama, Horana, Ingiriya and Kiriella. Its distance is 68 kilometers.

A08 highway